Ron English (born June 6, 1959) is an American contemporary artist who explores brand imagery, street art, and advertising.

Career
English has produced images on the street, in museums, in movies, books and television. He coined the term POPaganda to describe a mash-up of high and low cultural touchstones, from superhero mythology to totems of art history, populated with his original characters, including MC Supersized, the obese fast-food mascot featured in the movie Super Size Me, and Abraham Obama, the fusion of America's 16th and 44th Presidents. Other characters in English's paintings, billboards, and sculpture include three-eyed rabbits, cowgirls and grinning skulls – visual, with humorous undertones.

English was interviewed for the documentary Super Size Me (2004), which showed his McDonald's-themed artwork—inspired by his belief about the effect of fast food franchises and restaurant chains on American culture – "MC Supersized".

"Abraham Obama", made during the 2008 US Presidential Election, was a "portrait-fusion" of America's 16th and 44th Presidents.

English has painted album covers for the Dandy Warhols' Welcome to the Monkey House, the 2010 album Slash, and the Chris Brown album cover for F.A.M.E. Some of his paintings were used in the Morgan Spurlock documentaries Super Size Me and The Greatest Movie Ever Sold. English has collaborated with Daniel Johnston and Jack Medicine in the Hyperjinx Tricycle project. In 2010 he created the artwork for Art Nouveau Magazine's first print issue.

English is the subject of a Pedro Carvajal documentary titled Popaganda (after one of his art books). He is also a subject of "The Art Army" action figures by Michael Leavitt. English and his fellow artists Shepard Fairey, Kenny Scharf and Robbie Conal guest-starred on the March 4, 2012, episode of The Simpsons, "Exit Through the Kwik-E-Mart". In 2015 he was a guest judge on the Oxygen Network's reality show Streetart Throwdown created by Justin BUA.

In November 2021 English's giant immersive instillation Sugar Circus opened in Shenzhen, PRC marking the beginning of the exhibitions world tour.

Street art
English has an early background as an art reproducer. English has initiated and participated in illegal public art campaigns since the early 1980s and for this is often referred to as the 'Godfather of Street Art'. Ron English street art activities are the subject matter and covered extensively in the Pedro Carvajal documentary titled Popaganda.

Culture jamming is one aspect of English's work. Although never an official member, Ron several times joined with the Billboard Liberation Front, which practices culture jamming by altering billboards by changing key words to radically alter the message, often to an anti-corporate message. Frequent targets of English's work include Joe Camel, McDonald's, and Mickey Mouse.

English intends his culture jamming technique to inspire people to question consumer capitalism. English does this by using his over emphasized, grotesque, and to some, offensive, characters to intrigue the consumer, luring them in to reveal the truth behind the product.

Later English focused on another form of advertising: product packaging. He recreates several different kinds of packaging (cereal boxes, milk cartons, cigarette packs, etc.), to reveal truth in advertising. After designing the packaging English and his Team POPaganda infiltrate different retailers around the country and "shop gift". Some of English's product packaging designs include, "Cap'n Corn Starch", "Duncan High Hash Brownies" and "Camel Kool's" THC Enriched Tobacco Cigarettes.

English has created murals a locations throughout the world.

Fine art
English is a fine art painter specializing in oils. He received his bachelor of Fine Arts from the University of North Texas in Denton, Texas. He moved to New York City and apprenticed with several artists, beginning to sell his own work. His style is characterized by extreme photo realism, use of secondary color and appropriation of pop imagery. Frequent themes are revisiting and reworking childhood with adult skill as well as examining the darker meanings behind garish pop surface imagery. English also uses historical imagery as a template to explore universal issues. He has frequently reworked images of The Last Supper, Starry Night, and Picasso's Guernica.

English has appropriated many well known images and characters from pop culture, reworking them into his own images. These include a reworking of Charlie Brown into his "Grin" character and one of his famous "MC Supersized" based on the idea that Ronald McDonald ate his own product. Another image of the idealized American female is that of Marilyn Monroe with Mickey Mouse breasts.

In 1980, English exhibited "Grade School Guernica", one of his versions of Picasso's Guernica, at the Station Museum of Contemporary Art in Houston. The painting depicts the scene acted out by his children viewed from the point of view of the bomber airplane. His largest collection of "Guernica" paintings was on view at Allouche gallery in New York City from September to October 2016.

"Lazarus Rising" was English's first exhibit in the UK, at Elms Lesters Painting Rooms in London. His exhibition "Season in Supurbia" took place in 2009 at the Corey Helford Gallery in Culver City. In 2011 he exhibited "Skin Deep: Post-Instinctual Afterthoughts on Psychological Nature", a new body of works exploring the inner lives of iconic figures, at Lazarides in London that represents the artist.

Designer toys 
In 2005 English began creating designer toy versions of his creatures. Ronnnie Rabbit was English's first designer toy, produced in 2005 by Dark Horse. In 2013, he joined Slash to create a limited edition fiberglass bust of the image used for the Slash and Friends album artwork. He also joined singer Chris Brown to launch their "Dum English" toy; a 10-inch turquoise and pink Astronaut Star Skull.

In 2013, English collaborated with rock band Pearl Jam to produce "Falla Sheep", a blind box line-up with seven color variants of 3.5 inch sheep in wolves' clothing toys. These were sold in stores and also at shows during Pearl Jam's 2013 tour.

Books 
Original Grin: The Art of Ron English (2019)
POPaganda: The Art & Subversion of Ron English (2004)
Ron English's Fauxlosophy (2016)
Ron English's Popaganda Coloring Book (2017)
Ron English's Vandalism Starter Kit (2014)
Lazarus Rising (2009)
Art for Obama (2009)
Abject Expressionism (2007)
Son of Pop: Ron English Paints His Progeny (2007)
Abraham Obama (2010)
Art is a Horrible Waste of the Imagination (1988)
Status Factory (2014)
Death and the Eternal Forever (2014)

References

External links 

Popaganda
Songs In English – a collaborative music project between artist Ron English and The Electric Illuminati

20th-century American painters
American male painters
Living people
1959 births
Anti-consumerists
Artists from Jersey City, New Jersey
Photorealist artists
21st-century American painters
21st-century male artists
Painters from New Jersey
Painters from Illinois
People from Decatur, Illinois